Lord Marshall may refer to:
Horace Brooks Marshall, 1st Baron Marshall of Chipstead (1865–1936), British publisher, newspaper distributor and Lord Mayor of London
Frank Marshall, Baron Marshall of Leeds (1915–1990), leader of Leeds City Council
Walter Marshall, Baron Marshall of Goring (1932–1996), British physicist and chairman of the Central Electricity Generating Board
Colin Marshall, Baron Marshall of Knightsbridge (1933–2012), chairman and chief executive officer of British Airways

See also
Lord Marshal (disambiguation)